Lord Edward Charles Cavendish-Bentinck (3 March 1744 – 8 October 1819), known as Lord Edward Bentinck, was a British politician who sat in the House of Commons  from 1766 to 1802.

Background and education
Bentinck was the second son of William Bentinck, 2nd Duke of Portland, by Lady Margaret Cavendish Harley, daughter of Edward Harley, 2nd Earl of Oxford. He was the only brother of Prime Minister William Cavendish-Bentinck, 3rd Duke of Portland. He was educated at Westminster and Christ Church, Oxford, and went on a Grand Tour between 1764 and 1766.

Political career
Bentinck sat as Member of Parliament for Lewes between 1766 and 1768, for Carlisle between 1768 and 1774, for Nottinghamshire between 1774 and 1796 and for Clitheroe between 1796 and 1802. The Clitheroe seat was reportedly to be purchased by the Duke of Portland from the Lister family for £4,000. However, the money could not be found and Thomas Lister was granted a peerage on Portland's recommendation as compensation. Despite his long parliamentary career Bentinck never held ministerial office.

Family
Bentinck married Elizabeth, daughter of the dramatist Richard Cumberland, on 28 December 1782. They had two sons and two daughters:
Ven. William Harry Edward Bentinck (1784–1868), Archdeacon of Westminster
Cavendish Charles Bentinck (1785–1809)
Harriet Elizabeth Bentinck (died 1862), married 1809 Sir William Mordaunt Sturt Milner 
Charlotte Georgina Sophia Bentinck (1789–1819), married 1814 Lt. Gen. Sir Robert Garrett 

He was said to have been rescued from financial difficulties by his elder brother, but spent the last years of his life in Brussels, apparently due to financial constraints. He died in October 1819, aged 75. Lady Edward Bentinck died in 1837.

References

1744 births
1819 deaths
Alumni of Christ Church, Oxford
Edward
British MPs 1761–1768
British MPs 1768–1774
British MPs 1774–1780
British MPs 1780–1784
British MPs 1784–1790
British MPs 1790–1796
British MPs 1796–1800
Members of the Parliament of Great Britain for English constituencies
Members of the Parliament of the United Kingdom for constituencies in Lancashire
People educated at Westminster School, London
UK MPs 1801–1802
Younger sons of dukes
Members of the Parliament of Great Britain for Carlisle